Shazam! is a half-hour live-action television program that was produced for Saturday Mornings by Filmation (the studio's first non-animated series), based on the superhero Captain Marvel, now known as Shazam, of Fawcett Comics' comic book series Whiz Comics (now owned by DC Comics). The program starred Michael Gray as Billy Batson, a teenage boy who can transform into the superhero Captain Marvel, originally played by Jackson Bostwick and later by John Davey, by speaking the magic word "Shazam!" With his guardian "Mentor" (Les Tremayne), Billy travels the country in a 1973 Dodge Open Road motorhome, looking for injustices to resolve.

The show ran from 1974 to 1976 on CBS's Saturday morning lineup. From 1975 to 1977 it was known as The Shazam!/Isis Hour and included The Secrets of Isis, about an Ancient Egyptian superheroine resurrected in the body of a schoolteacher, as the second half of the hour.

Format
The Mentor character, as played by Les Tremayne, was unique to the TV series and did not originate from the Shazam! comics. His background, and the origin of his relationship to Billy, were never explained.

In later issues of the 1970s Shazam! comics meant to tie-in with the TV show, Billy's Uncle Dudley grows a moustache, drives Billy around the country in an RV, and tells Billy that the Wizard Shazam chose him to be Billy's "mentor", essentially turning Dudley into the comic book version of Mentor. The Mentor character has not been used since, although Uncle Dudley is shown driving a similar RV in the 2010s animated series Justice League Action.

Neither Mary nor Freddy appeared in this series, although the three main members of the Marvel Family did appear together in new stories in the tie-in era comics.

After Shazam! was paired with The Secrets of Isis in 1975, Joanna Cameron, the star of Isis, appeared as Isis and her alter-ego Andrea Thomas on three episodes of Shazam!, and John Davey likewise appeared as Captain Marvel in three episodes of Isis.

Shazam! is one of the first Filmation productions to carry the trademark spinning executive producers' credit wheel ("Norm Prescott-Lou Scheimer") during the opening credits rather than the closing credits.

Broadcast history
After its original network run, Shazam! was brought back for reruns from January 5 through August 30, 1980. A handful of episodes appeared on Nickelodeon/Nick@Nite’s sister network, TV Land infrequently throughout the 2000s, originally appearing on the "Ultimate Fan Hour" in early 2004 as part of the "TV Land Kitschen" late weekend night programming block. The series was available for streaming on the now defunt DC Universe streaming service. As of January, 2023, the series is available for free streaming on Tubi.

Episodes

Season 1 (1974)

Season 2 (1975)

Season 3 (1976)

Home media
The pilot episode, "The Joy Riders", was released as Warner Bros. Television Commemorative DVD Volume 8: Shazam, part of a DVD series designed to promote 50 years of Warner Bros. Television and to promote other TV shows that were not yet released on DVD. It was included with the release of the third season of Wonder Woman in 2005 in North America. Meanwhile, the rights to The Secrets of Isis remained with Filmation's successors Entertainment Rights, Classic Media, and DreamWorks Classics; that series was released on DVD in its entirety in 2007, including the three episodes featuring Captain Marvel.

On October 23, 2012, Warner Bros. released Shazam!—The Complete Series on DVD via the Warner Archive burn on demand service.

Warner Archive re-released the complete series in HD on a four-disc Blu-ray set on October 8, 2019. The new HD masters for Shazam! were created from restorations of the original Filmation 16 mm and 35 mm film elements by Warner Bros.' in-house post-production team. The series is also available at the iTunes Store. As of January 2023 the series is available for free streaming on Tubi.

References

External links
 
Official Jackson Bostwick/SHAZAM! Site
Michael Gray's Facebook Page

1970s American children's television series
Captain Marvel (DC Comics) in other media
CBS original programming
Teen superhero television series
1974 American television series debuts
1976 American television series endings
Television shows based on DC Comics
DC Comics television series by Filmation
American superhero television series
American children's science fiction television series
Television series by Warner Bros. Television Studios
American children's action television series
American children's adventure television series
American children's fantasy television series
Television series about teenagers
English-language television shows